The 2000 African Cup of Nations Final was a football match that took place on 13 February 2000 at the Lagos National Stadium in Lagos, Nigeria, to determine the winner of the 2000 African Cup of Nations, the football championship of Africa organized by the Confederation of African Football (CAF).

Cameroon won the title for the third time by beating Nigeria 4–3 on penalties.

Match details
The first goal was scored after a foul on Patrick Mboma led to a free kick that was utilized by Samuel Eto'o in the 26th minute. In the 31st minute, Mboma capitalized on a through pass from Eto'o to double the Cameroonian lead, nutmegging Nigerian goalkeeper, Ike Shorunmu in the process.
  
Cameroon continued to press for most of the first half, and hit the post on an occasion. Surprise selection, Raphael Chukwu placed a low level shot at the back of the net to reduce the deficit to one before halftime. Then Okocha scored a long range shot to even the scoreline. Eto'o attempted to put Cameroon ahead again, but had his shot hit the sidebar. Substitute, Babagida also had a finely placed shot on target saved by Cameroon, goalkeeper, Bouker. Victor Ikpeba had a long range header go off target. The game was eventually decided on penalties with Cameroon emerging victorious.

Details

References

External links
 African Cup Of Nations 2000, The Shot
 African Nations Cup 2000 - Final Tournament Details

Final
2000
2000
2000
Africa Cup of Nations Final 2000
February 2000 sports events in Africa
2000 in Cameroonian football
1999–2000 in Nigerian football